Gozd Martuljek is a settlement in the Municipality of Kranjska Gora in the Upper Carniola region of Slovenia. The settlement was once called Rute and even today divided into Spodnje Rute (literally, 'lower Rute', located downstream on the Sava Dolinka River) and Zgornje Rute (literally, 'upper Rute', located upstream on the Sava Dolinka).

Name
The name of the settlement was changed from Gozd to Gozd Martuljek in 1955.

Gallery

References

External links 

Gozd Martuljek on Geopedia

Populated places in the Municipality of Kranjska Gora